Carl Otto von Eicken (31 December 1873, Mülheim an der Ruhr – 29 June 1960, Heilbronn) was a German otorhinolaryngologist.

Biography
He studied medicine at the universities of Kiel, Geneva, Munich, Berlin, and Heidelberg, where he served as an assistant to surgeon Vincenz Czerny. He received his habilitation for laryngo-rhinology (1903) and otology (1909) at the University of Freiburg, and in 1911 became a full professor at the University of Giessen, where subsequently, he was named head of the newly constructed ear, nose, and throat clinic. In 1920/21 he served as university rector. In 1922 he succeeded Gustav Killian (a former teacher) at the University of Berlin, where he maintained a professorship up until 1950.

In May 1935 and November 1944, he removed a polyp  from the left vocal cord of Adolf Hitler.
		
He is largely known for developing methods of examination for the throat and pharynx. The eponymous "Eicken's method" is facilitation of hypopharyngoscopy by means of forward traction on the cricoid cartilage by a laryngeal probe. He was the author of over 100 medical works — with Alfred Schulz van Treeck, he published an atlas on ear, nose and throat diseases, titled Atlas der Hals-, Nasen-, Ohren-Krankheiten (1940).

References 

1873 births
1960 deaths
People from Mülheim
Heidelberg University alumni
Academic staff of the Humboldt University of Berlin
Academic staff of the University of Giessen
German otolaryngologists
20th-century German physicians
Members of the German Academy of Sciences at Berlin